The 2022 Open Villa de Madrid was a professional tennis tournament played on outdoor clay courts. It was the first edition of the tournament which was part of the 2022 ITF Women's World Tennis Tour. It took place in Madrid, Spain between 14 and 20 November 2022.

Champions

Singles

  Aliona Bolsova def.  Tamara Korpatsch, 6–4, 6–2

Doubles

  Aliona Bolsova /  Rebeka Masarova def.  Lea Bošković /  Daniela Vismane, 6–3, 6–3

Singles main draw entrants

Seeds

 1 Rankings are as of 7 November 2022.

Other entrants
The following players received wildcards into the singles main draw:
  Andrea Lázaro García
  Guiomar Maristany
  Lidia Moreno Arias
  Marta Soriano Santiago

The following players received entry from the qualifying draw:
  Marie Benoît
  Lea Bošković
  Diletta Cherubini
  Francesca Curmi
  Sada Nahimana
  Lucie Nguyen Tan
  Andreea Prisăcariu
  Iryna Shymanovich

References

External links
 2022 Open Villa de Madrid at ITFtennis.com
 Official website

2022 ITF Women's World Tennis Tour
2022 in Spanish tennis
November 2022 sports events in Spain